Kumarpara is a locality in Guwahati, Assam. It is located to the west of the city and is a very densely populated and cosmopolitan area. The railway line passes at the North end of the locality and the Assam Trunk Road serves as the northernmost boundary. It is surrounded by the localities of Machkhowa, Bharalumukh, Fatasil Ambari and Athgaon. It comes under Bharalumukh Police Station. The Pin code of Kumarapara are 781 001  (Served by Guwahati GPO) and 781 009 (Served by Bharalumukh Post Office).

Geography 
The locality falls in the floods plains of the Brahmaputra and is part of the city of Guwahati. The Northern boundary is marked by the Assam Trunk Road and the southern boundary is marked by the Bharalu river. The locality served by the Faiz Ahmed Road or F.A. road which serves as the main road and the KRC road. There a number of other arterial roads also. The drainage system mostly consists of modern drainage system which were rebuilt recently. An old stream parallel to the F.A. road existed about 40 years ago but now been mostly filled up by land filling. Also, the locality is free from the problem of flash floods  which most of the other areas of the city suffer from. The Kumarpara panchali, is one of the rare intersections found in the city, where five streets meet.

History 
The locality is one of the oldest locality of the city of Guwahati and most families living here can trace their history to hundreds of years back. The rich history of the locality has been reflected in many books, such as Smritir Patat Mahanagarar Kumarpara by Md. Hedayat Ullah.

Places of interest

Religious Institutions 
The locality boosts of people of almost all major religious community found in India and thus, has many religious institutions present here. Some of them are very old and have a rich history. Some of the prominent ones are as follows, besides these there are numerous others also:-

 Kumarpara Santi Sabha, is one of the oldest religious institutions of the locality and has celebrated its platinum jubilee in the year 2013.
 Shiv and Ganesh Mandir.
 Kumarpara Masjid, it is one of the oldest mosques of Guwahati.

Cultural Institutions 
 Sebak Library, Kumarpara, one of the oldest libraries in Guwahati and its annual hand written publication "Gazali" in Assamese was enjoyed by all.

Educational Institutions 
The locality boosts of number of schools and they cater to the people of the locality. Besides the schools, there are a number of tuition centers and coaching institutes spread all over the locality.
 Sishu Niketan High School 
 Oakland English High School 
 Angels English High School 
 Badri Das School
 Eurokids 
 Bachpan

Sports Institutions 
The clubs of the locality have very rich history and have participated in most of the tournaments organised in the city of Guwahati but due to rapid growth of infrastructure, the number of sports fields and ground in the locality has depleted.
 Embrace United Club.
 Nayantara Club, hosts the annual Durga Puja, which is famous throughout the state of Assam.
 Jai Hind Club 
 kumarpara pin code

Financial Institutions 
 Central Bank of India 
 Central Bank Of India Kumarpara Ifsc Code

Financial Facilities 
 SBI ATM.
 HDFC Bank ATM.
 Union Bank ATM.
 ICICI BAnk ATM.
 Axis Bank ATM.
 Kotak Mahindra Bank.
 Central Bank of India

See also
 Chandmari
 Maligaon
 Uzan Bazaar
 Beltola
 Noonmati
 Panbazar

References 

Neighbourhoods in Guwahati